Swapan Dasgupta (born 3 October 1955) is an Indian journalist and politician. He is influential within the Indian right wing, writing columns for leading English dailies espousing Hindu nationalism. He is a nominated member of the Rajya Sabha. In 2015, Dasgupta was conferred with the Padma Bhushan for his contribution to literature and education.

Early life and education 
Dasgupta was born into a Bengali Baidya family on 3 October 1955 in Calcutta, West Bengal. He received his schooling from St. Paul's School and La Martiniere Calcutta before graduating from St. Stephen's College in 1975. He earned his MA and Ph.D. from the School of Oriental and African Studies and returned to India briefly in 1979 to take up a management position at Calcutta Chemical Company, a family.

However, within a year, Dasgupta returned to the United Kingdom as a Junior Research Fellow at Nuffield College, Oxford, where he taught and researched South Asian Politics. During this time, an excerpt from his thesis concerning the intersectionality of local politics in the Midnapur district was published in one of the Subaltern Studies volumes.

Career
Dasgupta has served in editorial positions over several English dailies in India including The Indian Express, The Times of India, The Statesman, India Today et cetera. He is a frequent guest on news channels in English-language debates on Indian politics and international affairs.

In February 2015, Swapan Dasgupta was appointed on the Board of Directors of Larsen and Toubro as a nominee of the Unit Trust of India. He stepped down from Directorship of Larsen and Toubro upon being appointed to the Rajya Sabha.

In 2019, he published Awakening Bharat Mata: The Political Beliefs of the Indian Right.

Dasgupta was conferred Honorary Visiting Professorship at Center for Media Studies (CMS) at Jawaharlal Nehru University (JNU) in recognition to his excellent expertise on journalism and media.

Politics
Dasgupta started as a Trotskite during college but became a Thatcherite in England; since then, he has self-identified with centre-right politics. Dasgupta has been active in national politics since the early 90s as a member of the Bharatiya Janata Party (BJP); he believed in the potential of the Mandal Commission recommendations and the Ram Rath Yatra to forge a common Hindu identity.

Mushirul Hasan, writing in 1997, held him the chief spokesperson of BJP in the English language press. In the early 2000s, Dasgupta blogged:

Throughout these years, Dasgupta emphasized the value of English in reaching out to the elites — who were allegedly mass-committed to the left-liberal cause — and winning them over towards hindutva; he was one of the most fierce critics of the pro-vernacular policies followed by the communist government of West Bengal.

Legislation 
In April 2016, the incumbent BJP government nominated Dasgupta to the Rajya Sabha as an eminent personality in literature; his term would have continued till 2022. However, in 2021, Dasgupta resigned from Rajya Sabha to contest the Legislative Assembly election in West Bengal for BJP from Tarakeswar; he lost by over 7000 votes. A month later, Dasgupta was renominated to the Rajya Sabha for the remainder of his original term — opposition politicians and constitutional scholars questioned the legal soundness of the renomination.

Reception 
Meera Nanda finds Dasgupta among India's most prominent center-right public intellectuals. Arvind Tajagopal found Dasgupta among the most vocal enthusiasts for the spread of Hindutva, in English language press in the 80s. Scholars have located parallels between his writings and the thought school of Hindu nationalist organisations.

Personal life 
He is married to Reshmi Ray Dasgupta, Lifestyle Editor at The Economic Times and has a son who is a practicing lawyer in the Supreme Court of India. They reside in New Delhi.

Bibliography

External links 

Swapan Dasgupta on Twitter

References

1955 births
Indian columnists
Living people
La Martiniere Calcutta alumni
St. Stephen's College, Delhi alumni
Alumni of SOAS University of London
Recipients of the Padma Bhushan in literature & education
Bharatiya Janata Party politicians from West Bengal
Indian male journalists
20th-century Indian journalists
Journalists from West Bengal
Writers from Kolkata
Politicians from Kolkata
Nominated members of the Rajya Sabha